The 1941 South Sydney Rabbitohs season was the 34th in the club's history. The club competed in the New South Wales Rugby Football League Premiership (NSWRFL), finishing the season 7th.

Ladder

Fixtures

References 

1941 in rugby league
1941 in Australian rugby league
1941 in Australian sport
South Sydney Rabbitohs seasons